Paolo Capizucchi (died 1539) was a Roman Catholic prelate who served as Bishop of Nicastro (1533–1539).

Biography
On 7 Nov 1533, Paolo Capizucchi was appointed during the papacy of Pope Clement VII as Bishop of Nicastro.
On 14 Feb 1535, he was consecrated bishop by Agostino Spínola, Cardinal-Priest of Sant'Apollinare. 
He served as Bishop of Nicastro until his death on 6 Aug 1539.

References

External links and additional sources
 (for Chronology of Bishops) 
 (for Chronology of Bishops)  

16th-century Italian Roman Catholic bishops
Bishops appointed by Pope Clement VII
1539 deaths